Palmyra sprout (also known as Palmyra tuber) is an underground sprout of the Palmyra palm or Borassus flabellifer. It can be dried or boiled to form Odiyal, a hard chewable snack.

It is used as an offering in Lakshmi Puja in various parts of Bengal and is also eaten raw.

Summary 
Palmyra sprouts are cultivated in the states of Tamil Nadu, Bihar, Telangana and Andhra Pradesh, India, and in Northern Province, Sri Lanka. In Tamilnadu, they are most common in Tirunelveli, Tenkasi, Tuticorin, Ramanathapuram, Vellore, Tiruvannamalai and Villupuram Districts. The seeds are planted and once they germinate the fleshy stems are harvested from below the surface. They are boiled or roasted and eaten. They are very fibrous and nutritious. 

They are known as Panai Kizhangu or Panamkizhangu (பனம் கிழங்கு) in Tamil and Thegalu or Gaygulu or Gengulu in Telugu.

See also
Heart of palm
Bamboo shoot

References 

Borassus
Tubers